CSMC may refer to:

 Confederate States Marine Corps, a branch of the Confederate States Navy during the American Civil War
 Command Sergeants Major Course, a career development course of the United States Army
 Cedars-Sinai Medical Center, a hospital in Los Angeles, California
 Chaim Sheba Medical Center, the largest hospital in Israel.
 Central Saint Martins College of Art and Design, famous Art School in London